Lieutenant Colonel Kenneth Arthur Spring  (23 October 1921 – 25 December 1997) was a British Army officer, artist and co-founder of the National Youth Theatre of Great Britain.

Early life and family
Spring was born in Dulwich, London, the son of Albert Spring (1884–1961), a former Royal Flying Corps officer and schoolmaster, and the composer, Cecil Dorothy Arburn Chapman (1885–1961). Spring was a descendant of the Suffolk Spring family, and a relation of Lord Risby and Brigadier-General Frederick Spring. He was educated at Alleyn's School, London, where he was a close friend of John Lanchbery, before attending Blackpool Art School.

Military career
On call-up in the Second World War, 22 February 1941, Spring registered as a conscientious objector and was conscripted into the Non-Combatant Corps (NCC); with other members of the NCC, he went on to volunteer for work in bomb disposal in London. In October 1941 he resigned his status as a conscientious objector, and served as a sapper in 15 Bomb Disposal Company, Royal Engineers, between December 1941 and July 1943, when he transferred to the staff of "B” Company, No.2 Training Battalion, Royal Engineers, at Blacon Camp. In March 1944 he was selected for officer training and undertook the Officer Cadet Training Unit commissioning course at Catterick Garrison. On 23 July 1944 he was commissioned into the Royal Regiment of Artillery.

He was posted to India in October 1944, taking command of 35 Battery, 33rd Indian Mountain Regiment, Royal Indian Artillery, part of the 25th Indian Infantry Division. He saw extensive action in the Arakan Campaign 1944–1945 in Burma, during which he was injured. On 30 March 1945 he was promoted to war substantive lieutenant and became adjutant of the 33rd Mountain Regiment. Spring was involved in Operation Zipper and served as the Station Staff Officer, South East Asia Command in Kuala Lumpur during the Japanese surrender. Between November 1945 and June 1946 he was Acting District Officer of Teluk Anson in British Malaya. In this position he established a prisoner-of-war camp for Japanese prisoners in Perak. He returned to England in June 1946 and was placed on the list of the regular reserve of officers. On 22 April 1947 he was released from regular service due to his wartime injuries and transferred to the Territorial and Army Volunteer Reserve, becoming honorary lieutenant.

He was promoted to acting captain on 17 November 1948 and to honorary lieutenant colonel on 25 April 1974. He was appointed to the committee of the Combined Cadet Force Association, and served as the CO of Alleyn's School CCF between 1960 and 1966. He was awarded the Efficiency Decoration for long service in 1961. Spring relinquished his commission in 1975, and was invested as an Officer of the Order of the British Empire (Military) the same year.

Artist and teacher
After returning to England in 1947, Spring gained an art teaching diploma from the University of London and became a teacher at his alma mater, Alleyn's School. In 1949 he founded the influential South East London Art Group, of which he became chairman, and was closely associated with artists such as Keith Godwin and Stanley Roy Badmin. In 1953 he was appointed Lecturer in Art at Goldsmiths, University of London. In 1958 he was appointed chief examiner of art by the London University Board and was responsible for the introduction of the new craft syllabus. He sat on the executive committee of the Camberwell Arts Council.

In 1956 he was a co-founder, alongside Michael Croft, of the National Youth Theatre. He was production manager for the Youth Theatre's first play, Henry V, which appeared at the Toynbee Hall in London in September 1956. He continued to be involved in Youth Theatre productions until 1962. In 1965 Spring moved to Oxfordshire to become a master at Bloxham School.

Style
Spring worked in a variety of media, including watercolour, oil, print, and carving in stone and wood. His body of work in watercolour and oil were largely of landscapes, and were in a similar style to S. R. Badmin. Other flat work shows strong affinities with contemporary neo-romantic artists such as John Piper. He was also influenced by Sir William Coldstream, who he met whilst serving in the Royal Artillery and from whom he received tutelage at Camberwell College of Arts. His wood carving style was influenced by Frank Dobson and Jacob Epstein, and mostly depicted the human form. Spring's woodcutting technique was influenced by Eric Ravilious.

Personal life
Spring married Doreen Healy in 1947 and together they had two children:
David Spring (1948–1980), married Elizabeth Gibbs
Michael Spring (b.1953), married Penelope Johns Taylor

He died on 25 December 1997 in Sibford Ferris and is buried in Bloxham.

References

1921 births
1997 deaths
Military personnel from London
20th-century British painters
British male painters
Academics of Camberwell College of Arts
Alumni of Goldsmiths, University of London
British Army personnel of World War II
British conscientious objectors
English printmakers
English watercolourists
Officers of the Order of the British Empire
People educated at Alleyn's School
Personnel of the Non-Combatant Corps
Royal Artillery officers
Royal Engineers soldiers
Kenneth
World War II artists
National Youth Theatre members
People from British Malaya
20th-century British male artists